beIN Sports is a Canadian exempt English language discretionary specialty channel that airs international sports content. beIN Sports primarily airs soccer, featuring coverage of such leagues as La Liga, Ligue 1,  along with content from other leagues in Europe. In addition, the channel airs matches from such sports as Rugby, Auto racing, Handball, Motorcycle racing, Tennis and Volleyball.

History

On 18 December 2013, Ethnic Channels Group announced that it had entered into a strategic partnership with Al Jazeera Media Network, owners of the beIN Sports brand, to launch a version of the beIN Sports brand in Canada. Initially, the agreement involved the launch of two channels, services in both English and Spanish. beIN Sports en Español launched in 2015.

On 31 January  2014, the English service, beIN Sports, officially launched in Canada on MTS, later launching in March on the larger television service providers, Rogers and Bell satellite and Fibe.

In August 2014, the CRTC approved a request by Ethnic Channels Group to have the U.S. Spanish-language version of beIN Sports, beIN Sports En Español, authorized for distribution in Canada.

In August 2017, Ethnic Channels Group reached a deal to sublicense beIN Sports content to the new over-the-top sports streaming service DAZN for its Canadian launch until 2019.

Programming
beIN Sports Canada features live and recorded events from the following leagues and competitions:

Soccer
France: Ligue 1, Ligue 2, Coupe de France, Trophée des Champions
 Turkey: Süper Lig
 Austria: ÖFB Cup (final only)
 South America: Copa Libertadores, Copa Sudamericana, Recopa Sudamericana
Africa

Auto racing
 Europe: FIA European Rallycross Championship

Motorcycle racing
 International Competitions: Motocross World Championship

Professional wrestling
 MLW Fusion

References

External links
 beIN Sports Canada
 beIN Sports Connect

BeIN Sports
Al Jazeera
Sports television networks in Canada
Soccer on Canadian television
Television channels and stations established in 2014
English-language television stations in Canada
2014 establishments in Canada